Bishop Ford Central Catholic High School was a private, Roman Catholic high school in the Windsor Terrace neighborhood of Brooklyn, New York. Open from 1962 through 2014, it closed following a period of steeply falling enrollment and with an estimated $4 million in outstanding debt. Now called the Bishop Ford Educational Complex, the building is used by New York City Department of Education to house a pre-kindergarten school and two middle schools.

History

Bishop Ford Central Catholic High School was established in 1962 by the Roman Catholic Diocese of Brooklyn. It was named after Bishop Francis Xavier Ford, a Brooklyn native and Maryknoll missionary who was martyred in China in 1952.  It was decorated in a Chinese-themed style, with a large red pagoda on its roof, signs with letters in a font meant to suggest Chinese characters, and a red-and-gold tiled lobby with light fixtures shaped like pagodas.

The school was built on the site of the former 9th Avenue bus and trolley depot, used until 1956 for trolleys, and for buses until 1959 following a fire, with bus routes moved to the 5th Avenue (today's Jackie Gleason Depot) & Ulmer Park Depots.

Bishop Ford Central Catholic High School was a Division I high school and had an active PTA and many clubs, activities, and sports. Some of the clubs included the International Society; Martial Arts Club; Science Club; Art Club; Student Activities Committee; Student Council; Newspaper and Yearbook. Bishop Ford Central Catholic High School's sports included basketball, baseball, football, bowling, soccer, cheerleading, volleyball, softball, and track as junior varsity and varsity teams.

Following a period of falling enrollment that saw the student body decrease 75%, from 1,347 students in 2006 to 499 in 2014, the school abruptly closed at the end of the 2013-14 school year.  It was one of a number of Catholic schools to close around that time, faced with increased competition from public and charter schools.

The school building is now used by the New York City Public School system for pre-k and middle schools. The religious symbols, such as a large cross that once stood above the entrance of the school, have been removed from the school building.

Notable alumni
 Glenn Braica (1982): basketball coach, head coach of the St. Francis College basketball team since 2010
 John Giuca (born 1983), felon
 John Gray (1976): screenwriter and television director, creator of TV series Ghost Whisperer
 John Halama (1990): Major League Baseball pitcher (1998–2006)
 Armond Hill (1971): professional basketball player in the NBA (1976–1984) and first-round pick in the 1976 NBA draft
 Charles Jones (1993): professional basketball player in the NBA and abroad (1998–2009)
 Jason Mattera (2001): conservative political commentator and author, editor of Human Events magazine
 Brian Nash (1988): basketball coach who was an assistant coach at Bishop Ford from 1992 to 1993
 Marco Oppedisano (1989): Guitarist and electroacoustic music composer
 Jimmy Iovine (1971): American record producer; co-founder of Interscope Records.

Filming Location
The building was used as a filming location for several commercials and music videos.

Rock band R.E.M.'s music video "All the Way to Reno (You're Gonna Be a Star)" was shot at Bishop Ford in 2001, directed by Michael Moore.

Rapper Drake's debut music video "Best I Ever Had" was shot at Bishop Ford in June 2009.

Record producer Mike WiLL Made It's debut music video "#23" was shot at Bishop Ford in August 2013. The music video features Mike WiLL Made It, singer Miley Cyrus, and rappers Wiz Khalifa and Juicy J.

The school building appears in several early shots in the 1975 film Dog Day Afternoon, which was filmed nearby.

Bishop Ford Educational Complex
The building now houses three public schools:
K-280, a pre-K school drawing students from across School District 15
Brooklyn Urban Garden School (BUGS), a middle school focused on environmental sustainability and education
MS 442, a middle school with a successful program for children with Autism Spectrum Disorder

Notes and references

Educational institutions established in 1962
Educational institutions disestablished in 2014
Roman Catholic Diocese of Brooklyn
1962 establishments in New York City
2014 disestablishments in New York (state)
Roman Catholic high schools in Brooklyn